Amina Said Ali is a Somali author, poet, and  medical scientist at the Karolinska Institute, in Stockholm, Sweden.

She was on a roundtable at the "Somalis in America Conference", 2004.

She is on the Advisory Board of Bildhaan.

Works
 118 Poems
 Qoriga u garwaaxshey asagoon sagallkii galin, Författares Bokmaskin, 2005,

References

Somalian poets
Somalian women writers
Somalian women poets
Somalian non-fiction writers
Year of birth missing (living people)
Living people
21st-century Somalian women writers
21st-century Somalian writers
Somali-language writers